Filip Dangubić (born 5 May 1995) is a Croatian football player who plays as a forward or an attacking midfielder for Lithuanian club Hegelmann.

Club career

Rijeka
Born in Rijeka, Dangubić spent his youth years with HNK Rijeka Academy. During the 2013–14 season of the U19 Croatian Academy Football League, he was the second top scorer with 16 goals. In June 2014, he signed his first professional contract with Rijeka that tied him with the club until June 2017. In his first professional season with the club, Dangubić mainly featured for the reserve side in Croatia's Treća HNL, scoring 16 goals. During the season he also made his debut for HNK Rijeka in a home win against Lokomotiva Zagreb on 10 May 2015.

Pomorac (loan)
In February 2014, Dangubić was loaned to Pomorac in Croatia's Druga HNL, but did not collect any caps due to a long-term injury.

Krka (loan)
In June 2015, Rijeka sent Dangubić on a season-long loan to Krka in Slovenia's PrvaLiga. On 25 October 2015, Dangubić scored his first goal for Krka in a PrvaLiga match against Krško.

Krško (loan)
In July 2016, he was loaned to Krško in Slovenia. He scored on debut in an away draw to Rudar Velenje on 16 July 2016.

Celje (loan)
In July 2017, he was once again sent on loan to a Slovenian club, this time to Celje.

Spartak Trnava
On 4 July 2018, Dangubić was transferred to Spartak Trnava in Slovakia.

Senica (loan)
On 21 February 2019, Dangubić was loaned to Senica in Slovakia.

Chindia Târgoviște
On 6 February 2020, Romanian side Chindia Târgoviște announced the signing of Dangubić.

Return to Celje
On 4 August 2020, Dangubić returned to Slovenian champions Celje, signing a contract until 30 June 2022. He was released by the club on 28 June 2021.

International career
Dangubić was capped for Croatia at various age levels. He collected one cap for the U17 side, two caps for the U20 side, and four caps for the U21 side.

Honours
HNK Rijeka
Prva HNL runner-up: 2014–15, 2017–18

Celje
Slovenian Cup runner-up: 2020–21

References

External links

Profile and statistics at NZS 

1995 births
Living people
Footballers from Rijeka
Association football forwards
Association football midfielders
Croatian footballers
Croatia youth international footballers
Croatia under-21 international footballers
HNK Rijeka players
HNK Rijeka II players
NK Pomorac 1921 players
NK Krka players
NK Krško players
NK Celje players
FC Spartak Trnava players
FK Senica players
AFC Chindia Târgoviște players
FC UTA Arad players
FC Hegelmann players
Second Football League (Croatia) players
Croatian Football League players
Slovenian PrvaLiga players
Slovak Super Liga players
Liga I players
A Lyga players
Croatian expatriate footballers
Expatriate footballers in Slovenia
Expatriate footballers in Slovakia
Expatriate footballers in Romania
Expatriate footballers in Lithuania
Croatian expatriate sportspeople in Slovenia
Croatian expatriate sportspeople in Slovakia
Croatian expatriate sportspeople in Romania
Croatian expatriate sportspeople in Lithuania